The 2014 Lehigh Mountain Hawks football team represented Lehigh University in the 2014 NCAA Division I FCS football season. They were led by ninth-year head coach Andy Coen and played their home games at Goodman Stadium. They were a member of the Patriot League. They finished the season 3–8, 2–4 in Patriot League play to finish in a tie for fifth place.

This year was the 150th meeting of The Rivalry against Lafayette College and was played at Yankee Stadium in The Bronx. Lehigh's marching band, the Marching 97, performed not only during the game, but also the day before around Manhattan to boost spirits.

Schedule

References

Lehigh
Lehigh Mountain Hawks football seasons
Lehigh Mountain Hawks football